Arthur Bessa dos Santos (born 15 February 2001) is a Brazilian footballer who currently plays as a forward.

Career statistics

Club

Notes

References

2001 births
Living people
Brazilian footballers
Brazilian expatriate footballers
Association football forwards
Cruzeiro Esporte Clube players
Sport Club Corinthians Paulista players
F.C. Alverca players
Khor Fakkan Sports Club players
UAE Pro League players
Expatriate footballers in Portugal
Brazilian expatriate sportspeople in Portugal
Expatriate footballers in the United Arab Emirates
Brazilian expatriate sportspeople in the United Arab Emirates
Footballers from São Paulo